Mark William Neumann (born February 27, 1954) is an American businessman and politician. He represented  for two terms, from 1995 to 1999. In 2010, Neumann lost a bid to become the Republican nominee for Governor of Wisconsin. Neumann was a candidate for U.S. Senate in Wisconsin to succeed Herb Kohl who was retiring. He came in third place during the 2012 Republican primary election on August 14, 2012.

Early life, education, and early career
Neumann was born in East Troy, Wisconsin, one of five siblings. His parents were Stella and Kurt Neumann. His father was an electrical engineer for General Motors and his mother was an executive assistant. Neumann graduated from East Troy High School in 1972. After high school, he briefly attended General Motors Institute (now Kettering University). In 1973, Neumann married Sue Link, his high school sweetheart, whom he met in Sunday school in the 4th grade. That same year, Neumann enrolled at the University of Wisconsin-Whitewater, where he graduated with honors in 1975, earning a Bachelor of Science in Mathematics. After graduating from Whitewater, Neumann moved to River Falls, Wisconsin, where he taught mathematics at River Falls High School while attending the University of Wisconsin-River Falls, earning a Masters of Science in Supervision and Instructional Leadership. Neumann did additional post-graduate work at the University of Wisconsin.

After college, Neumann relocated to Milton, Wisconsin, where he began his career teaching Mathematics at Milton High School and Milton College, before the campus closed in 1982. Neumann is a member of the Wisconsin Evangelical Lutheran Synod.
He started his first company in 1986 in his basement, building homes in the Milton and Janesville, WI areas. By 1991, Neumann's company was listed as one of the fastest-growing companies in the U.S. by Inc. Magazine.

U.S. House of Representatives

Elections
1992
Neumann decided to run for the House of Representatives as a Republican in 1992. He faced Congressman Les Aspin and lost 58% to 41%, while spending $700,000.

| colspan="6" style="text-align:center; background:#e9e9e9;"| Primary Election

| colspan="6" style="text-align:center; background:#e9e9e9;"| General Election

1993 special election
Shortly after defeating Neumann, Aspin was appointed U.S. Secretary of Defense by President Bill Clinton in 1993. Just months after being defeated by over 17%, Neumann entered the special election to fill the seat vacated by Aspin. Neumann lost narrowly to his opponent, Peter Barca by only 675 votes; 49.3% to Barca's 49.9%.

| colspan="6" style="text-align:center; background:#e9e9e9;"| Primary Election

| colspan="6" style="text-align:center; background:#e9e9e9;"| General Election

1994
After losing in both 1992 and 1993, Neumann once again entered the race for Wisconsin’s First Congressional District. After losing to Peter Barca by 675 votes in the previous year, Neumann defeated Barca by 1,120 votes, becoming the first Republican to hold that seat since 1971. Neumann's victory was one of 52 Republican pick-up seats during the Republican Revolution.

| colspan="6" style="text-align:center; background:#e9e9e9;"| General Election

1996
Neumann won re-election by 4,260 votes in a close 1996 race against Lydia Spottswood.

| colspan="6" style="text-align:center; background:#e9e9e9;"| General Election

Tenure
Neumann was sworn into the 104th United States Congress on January 3, 1995, when the Republican Party gained control of both houses for the first time since the 1950s. Neumann was assigned to the Appropriations committee, being the only freshman appointed to the committee that year. While on the committee, Neumann wrote his own version of the budget, which would produce a balanced budget by 1999. Neumann voted present in the election for Speaker of the House in 1997, instead of voting for Newt Gingrich.

In September 1995, Neumann introduced an amendment requiring congressional approval of troop deployment to Bosnia which failed to pass. Then, on September 29, he voted to defeat the $243 billion military appropriation, along with other freshman Members, because it did not contain his amendment. As punishment for his vote, Bob Livingston removed him from the committee. This was brief, and Neumann was eventually reassigned to the committee.

Neumann has been critical of LGBT rights in the past. In 1996, he commented to the New York Times that "if I was elected God for a day, homosexuality wouldn't be permitted, but nobody's electing me God".

Committee assignments
Congressman Neumann served on the following committees and subcommittees:
 Committee on Appropriations
 Veterans Administration
 Transportation, Housing and Urban Development, and Related Agencies
 Committee on the Budget

1998 U.S. Senate election

In September 1997, Neumann announced his candidacy for the United States Senate against incumbent Russ Feingold. Both candidates had similar views on the budget surplus, although Neumann was for banning partial-birth abortion while Feingold was against a ban. Both candidates limited themselves to $3.8 million in campaign spending ($1 for every citizen of Wisconsin), although outside groups spent more than $2 million on Neumann; Feingold refused to have outside groups spend on his behalf. Feingold defeated Neumann by a 3% margin in the election, 51% - 48%. Neumann had a 68,000-vote deficit in Milwaukee County.

| colspan="6" style="text-align:center; background:#e9e9e9;"| General Election

Post-congressional career
Neumann stayed out of the 2004 Senate campaign, instead supporting former Lt. Governor Margaret Farrow, who did not run. Despite speculation that Neumann might run against Senator Herb Kohl or Governor Jim Doyle, he did not choose to seek elective office during the 2006 election cycle.  He had considered a run for Governor, but did not enter the race in deference to Scott Walker, who withdrew in favor of former Congressman Mark Green.

2010 gubernatorial election

Neumann told the Wisconsin State Journal on April 23, 2009 that he intended to run for governor in 2010, and on July 1, 2009, Neumann officially declared his candidacy.

In 2010 Neumann stated his opposition to same-sex marriage, and claimed that he wanted to focus on jobs and economic development.

Neumann was defeated 59% to 39% in the September 14, 2010 primary by opponent Scott Walker. Walker was ultimately elected Governor in the general election.

| colspan="6" style="text-align:center; background:#e9e9e9;"| Primary Election

2012 U.S. Senate election

In August 2011, Neumann announced his candidacy for the Senate seat of retiring senator Herb Kohl. On October 6, 2011, it was announced that he had raised $300,000 during the first month of the campaign.
After receiving endorsements from conservative groups such as the Club for Growth and Americans For Prosperity, Neumann split the Tea Party vote with millionaire businessman Eric Hovde. Neumann came in third place, taking 23% of the vote.

| colspan="6" style="text-align:center; background:#e9e9e9;"| Primary Election

References

External links
 
 

1954 births
Living people
Kettering University alumni
American Lutherans
University of Wisconsin–Whitewater alumni
University of Wisconsin–River Falls alumni
University of Wisconsin–Madison College of Letters and Science alumni
People from East Troy, Wisconsin
Republican Party members of the United States House of Representatives from Wisconsin
People from Milton, Wisconsin